Galapagar is a town and municipality northwest of Madrid, Spain, situated in the autonomous community of the Community of Madrid. Of all the towns in the area, it was experiencing the most growth, mostly because of immigration and the conversion of old livestock fields into terrain for construction.

The name Galapagar comes from the Spanish galápago, meaning turtle, as the town centre was settled near a lake full of turtles. 
The town first appears as a village in the eleventh century, its importance due to the frequent hunting expeditions by the Spanish royalty, and being a main stop on the road from the capital to the Royal Monastery of San Lorenzo de El Escorial. Sights in the town include the church of The Asunción (Assumption).

Galapagar is served by lines C-3, C-8 and C-10 of the Cercanías Madrid commuter rail service at its Galapagar-La Navata train station; and by 9 lines of Interurban Bus Service linking it to Moncloa district of Madrid.

Jacinto Benavente, one of the foremost Spanish dramatists of the 20th century and 1922 laurate of the Nobel Prize in Literature, is buried here. The British writer Malcolm Brocklehurst lived in the village between 1982 and 1983.

Bullfighting, stock-breeding, meadows and beef are the main features of Galapagar. The bullfighter José Tomás was born in this place.

See also
 Los Negrales

References

Municipalities in the Community of Madrid